Jennifer Capriati defeated Kim Clijsters in the final, 1–6, 6–4, 12–10 to win the women's singles tennis title at the 2001 French Open. Clijsters became the first Belgian woman to reach a major singles final, having won an all-Belgian semifinal against Justine Henin for the honor.

Mary Pierce was the reigning champion, but did not compete due to a back injury.

This marked the first major in which future major champion Marion Bartoli competed in the main draw. It also marked the French Open debut of 2010 champion Francesca Schiavone, who reached the quarterfinals, her best result at the tournament until her title run nine years later.

This was the last major to feature only 16 seeds.

Seeds
The seeded players are listed below. Jennifer Capriati is the champion; others show the round in which they were eliminated.

Qualifying

Draw

Finals

Top half

Section 1

Section 2

Section 3

Section 4

Bottom half

Section 5

Section 6

Section 7

Section 8

References

External links
2001 French Open – Women's draws and results at the International Tennis Federation

Women's Singles
French Open by year – Women's singles
French Open - Women's Singles
French Open - Singles
French Open - Singles